The temples of Wadi es-Sebua (so-called because of the sphinx-lined approach to the temple forecourts), is a pair of New Kingdom Egyptian temples, including one speos temple constructed by the 19th Dynasty Pharaoh Ramesses II, in Lower Nubia.

As part of the International Campaign to Save the Monuments of Nubia, along with Abu Simbel, Philae, Amada, and other Nubian archaeological sites, the temples at Wadi es-Sebua were relocated in the 1960s and inscribed on the UNESCO World Heritage List in 1979.

First Temple of Amenhotep III
The first temple was built by the 18th Dynasty Pharaoh Amenhotep III and subsequently restored by Ramesses II.  In its first stage, this temple "consisted of a rock-cut sanctuary (about 3 m by 2 m) fronted by a brick-built pylon, a court and a hall, partly painted with wall paintings."  The temple was perhaps dedicated to one of the local Nubian forms of Horus, but his representations were altered to Amun at a later point in time.  During the Amarna Period, images of Amun were attacked and the decorations deteriorated but Ramesses II later restored and extended Amenhotep III's temple by building structures in front of the pylon.

The temple of Amun of Ramesses II

The second larger temple which was built at el-Sebua was known as "The Temple of Ri'amesse-meryamun [Ramesses II] in the Domain of Amun" and constructed roughly 150 m northeast of Amenhotep III's temple. Contemporary monuments and representations of the viceroy of Kush, Setau, indicate that this temple was set up between Years 35 and Year 50 of Ramesses II. Setau is known to have served as the Viceroy of Kush or Nubia between Year 38 to 63 of this pharaoh's reign and was responsible for Ramesses' later Nubian temples. The temple of Wadi es-Sebua was the third sanctuary or chapel constructed from rock with a forecourt built with stones that Ramesses II erected in Nubia. Located at approximately a hundred and fifty kilometers south of Aswan, on the western bank of the Nile, the temple owed its importance to the fact that during the Ramesside period, the city was built at the outlet of the caravan roads, was used as the place of residence for the viceroy of Kush and because it was located at a difficult stretch of the Nile which was difficult for boats to traverse up against the current. Ramesses II entrusted the management of his work projects here to the viceroy of Nubia Setau which, if one judges by the poor quality of the Osiride style and statues of the court, was forced to settle on an "untrained work force, many of whom were snatched from the Libyan oases" and by "inferior raw materials." 

The temple of "Ramesses beloved of Amon in the field of Amun" was used as a quay or resting place for boats during its descent of the Nile river. The local Arabs, inspired by the stone sculptures of sphinxes which lined the entrance to the first temple, baptized the place as 'Wadi es-Sebua' or the Valley of the lions. The temple comprised three distinct parts: two open courts which were decorated with sphinxes or dromos, a large interior court with Osiride pillars and the rock hewn temple. This temple was, hence, "partly free-standing and partly rock-cut." 

The temple once possessed three pylons. The first two, however, were made of inferior Nile mud brick and have since crumbled. Only the stone gate passageway through them has survived. Beyond the first tower, the first courtyard appears with two human headed sphinxes accompanied by two statues of the pharaoh himself which originally stand on both sides of the passageway. Only the left-hand statue of Ramesses II remains in situ whereas the other statue now lies in the desert. Beyond the second pylon, a second courtyard with four falconheaded sphinxes appear representing Horus of Miam, of Meha, of Baki and, curiously, Horus of Edfu when one would expect that of Buhen instead in Nubia. Between their legs, a statuette with the image of Ramesses capped with the némès crown appears. On their base, an inscription states Ramesses "Lord of Sed-festivals, as his/her Ptah father" refers to the desire for longevity on behalf of this pharaoh which was already expressed on the vestiges of the second door: "Ramsès-Meryamun, lord of Sed-festivals, like Ptah." Just prior to entering the third tower, four colossal statues of Ramesses II appear of which, only one statue remains upright today. The third pylon is decorated with the conventional Egyptian style of the Pharaoh smiting his enemies and making offerings to the gods, including himself. Once one passes through the third pylon, the rock cut section of the temple begins with a hypostyle hall composed of 12 square pillars:
 "of which the central six were once adorned with Osirid statues of the king; these were chiselled off by the Christians. However, the offering scenes on the walls survive, and some retain their [original] colour."

The "antechamber opens into two side rooms, two side chapels and the sanctuary itself." Although the statues in the sanctuary niches were destroyed, they "undoubtedly represented Amon-Re, Re-Harakhty and Ramesses II himself." The larger temple at Wadi es-Sebua was built in the rather rough Nubian style, which marked some of Ramesses II's larger buildings.

Development into a church
In the 5th century AD, the temple was converted into a Christian church. Some temple reliefs were covered with a layer of plaster, where painted images of God was done. This layer helped to preserve for posterity the original reliefs; the best examples here are located in the sanctuary and associated chapels of Ramesses' temple where colourful scenes depict Ramesess adoring the sacred boats of Amun-Re and Re-Horakhty. There is also an interesting scene in the central niche of Wadi es-Sebua temple where two statues of Amun and Re-Horakhty which stood besides Ramesses II were hacked away by later Christian worshippers and replaced by an image of St. Peter. When the plaster coating was removed from the carved reliefs, one finds a bizarre image of Ramesses II offering flowers to St Peter instead.

Relocation of the Temple
When the Wadi es-Sebua temples were threatened by flooding from the construction of the Aswan Dam project, the temple was dismantled in 1964 with U.S. support by the Egyptian Antiquities Service. They were moved to a new site only 4 km west from their original location.  

The Temple of Dakka and Temple of Maharraqa were also moved and rebuilt at the New Wadi es-Sebua temple complex area.

See also
 List of ancient Egyptian sites

References

External links

The excavations and survey between Wadi es-Sebua and Adindan, 1929–1931 by W. B. Emery & L. P. Kirwan

Egyptian temples
International Campaign to Save the Monuments of Nubia